Pestom Sagar is a 27-acre residential colony in the suburb of Chembur. It houses a 50-year-old complex of 120 buildings. The Holy Family Church and Holy Family High School lies on Road number 4 of Pestom Sagar. The nearest landmark to this place is Amar Mahal junction, Eastern Express Highway, Chembur.
It has 6 main roads all interconnected and is off the GM road (Ramakrishna Chemburkar Marg) that connects Amar Mahal Junction to Ghatkopar. 

Suburbs of Mumbai